Brandon Bennett (born February 3, 1973) is a former American football running back who played professionally in the National Football League (NFL) for the Cincinnati Bengals and the Carolina Panthers. He played college football at the University of South Carolina. In high school, Bennett was on the track team as well as the basketball team.

In January 2017, he became the head football coach at St. Joseph's Catholic School in Greenville. He was previously employed as dean of students at Carolina High School and Academy in Greenville, South Carolina, and then served as the director of intramural sports at Southside Christian School in Simpsonville, South Carolina.

References

External links
 

1973 births
Living people
American football running backs
Carolina Panthers players
Cincinnati Bengals players
South Carolina Gamecocks football players
High school football coaches in South Carolina
Sportspeople from Greenville, South Carolina
Coaches of American football from South Carolina
Players of American football from South Carolina